Charles Kerr (April 6, 1892 – February 14, 1954) was an American assistant director who worked in both the silent and sound film eras. While he never was the main individual behind the helm, Kerr was an assistant director on over fifty feature films, and a production manager on several more.  He was also involved in the creation of five screenplays, co-authoring three of them.

Born in Chattanooga, Tennessee on April 6, 1892, he would break into the film industry as an assistant director on the 1925 film Three Wise Crooks. Initially, he would work almost exclusively with the director James Leo Meehan at FBO Pictures, and would continue on at RKO Radio Pictures after its creation by merging FBO with the KAO theater chain, under RCA. He would remain at RKO until 1937, when he moved over to United Artists. His career would begin to dwindle during the 1940s, although he would co-author two screenplays during that decade: Li'l Abner in 1940 and 1946's Vacation in Reno.  During his career he would work with such notable directors as Gregory La Cava, Lew Landers, and William Dieterle.

Filmography
(as per AFI's database)

References

External links

American male screenwriters
American filmmakers
People from Chattanooga, Tennessee
1892 births
1954 deaths
Screenwriters from Tennessee
20th-century American male writers
20th-century American screenwriters